The Lubuge Dam is a rock-fill embankment dam on the Huangni River, a tributary of the Nanpan River, located near Lubugexiang in Luoping County on the border of Guizhou and Yunnan Provinces, China. The primary purpose of the dam is hydroelectric power generation and it supports a 600 MW power station. Construction on the project began in 1982 and it was completed in 1991. Funded by the World Bank, it was the first loan offered by the bank to China's power sector.

Background
In June 1981, the Government of the People's Republic of China approved the project. Construction on the dam began in 1982 and the river was diverted on 15 November 1985. On 21 November 1988, the dam began to impound the reservoir and the first generator was commissioned on 27 December 1988. The second was commissioned in 1989 and the third in 1990. The fourth and final generator went online on 14 June 1991. The entire project was complete on 31 December 1991. A US$141.4 million World Bank loan helped fund the dam and power station. It was the first World Bank loan for the power sector in China.

Design
To control floods, the dam has three spillways. The power station contains four 150 MW Francis turbine-generators for a total installed capacity of 600 MW.

See also

List of dams and reservoirs in China
List of tallest dams in China

References

Dams in China
Rock-filled dams
Dams completed in 1988
Hydroelectric power stations in Yunnan
Energy infrastructure completed in 1991
Hydroelectric power stations in Guizhou
Underground power stations
1991 establishments in China
Buildings and structures in Qujing